Walter Scott (10 September 1855 – 26 February 1925) was an  English classical scholar, professor of classics at the University of Sydney and McGill University, Montreal, Quebec.

Scott was born in Newton Tracey, Devon, England, third son of George Erving Scott and his wife Agnes, née Ward. He was educated at Christ's Hospital School and Balliol College, Oxford from 1874, where he graduated with first-class honours in classics (1878) and the Ireland, Craven and Derby scholarships.

From 1879–86 Scott was a fellow of Merton College. In 1884, after the death of Charles Badham Scott was appointed professor of classics at the University of Sydney, his inaugural lecture, 'What is Classical Study', delivered on 23 March 1885, was published as a pamphlet. In the same year his Fragmenta herculanensia: A Descriptive Catalogue of the Oxford Copies of the Herculanean Rolls Together with the Texts of Several Papyri Accompanied by Facsimiles, published at Oxford by the Clarendon Press, established his reputation as a scholar. The book is concerned with the classical texts preserved in the papyri found at the Villa of the Papyri in Herculaneum, and contains, besides the catalogue proper, a number of edited papyrus texts with commentary, including works of Philodemus.

At Sydney, Scott took much interest in the university as a whole. He was one of the leaders in the movement for the establishment of the women's college, and as dean of the faculty of arts encouraged the teaching of modern literature, history and philosophy, and the inauguration of university extension lectures. His health was, however, not good and in 1890 at his own suggestion his chair was divided, and he became professor of Greek. Scott carried out the duties of this chair for about 10 years, but resigned due to continued ill-health in August 1900.

Scott returned to England and in 1905 became professor of classics at McGill University, Montreal, Quebec. He, however, retired again in 1908 and spent the remainder of his life at Oxford. He contributed several papers to classical journals in England, Australia and Canada, and devoted his later years to the preparation of an edition of the text of the Hermetica, subtitled The Ancient Greek and Latin Writings which contain Religious or Philosophic Teachings, ascribed to Hermes Trismegistus, with an English translation and notes. When Scott died of heart disease on 26 February 1925 the first volume had been published, and the second and third were in the press. The fourth volume, completed by Professor A. S. Ferguson, came out some years later.

Though essentially a scholar and shy in nature, Scott's work at Sydney and Montreal was much appreciated. His combination of profound and wide scholarship with idealism was a strong influence in university and teaching life. He did distinguished work as a classical scholar, but the amount of it was limited by his precarious health.

References

1855 births
1925 deaths
Fellows of Merton College, Oxford
Academic staff of the University of Sydney
Classical scholars of the University of Sydney
English classical scholars